The Ministry of Environment, Urbanisation and Climate Change is a government ministry office of the Republic of Turkey, responsible for the environment, public works, and urban planning in Turkey. The ministry is headed by Murat Kurum.

History
The Ministry was formed in 1983 through the merger of the Ministry of Public Works (formed 3 May 1920) and the Ministry of Development and Housing (formed 1958). The result was the Ministry of Public Works and Housing, which was renamed to the current Ministry of Environment and Urbanisation on 29 June 2011. In 2021 climate change was added to the name.

Responsibilities 

The ministry is responsible for combating climate change in Turkey. Despite the Energy Ministry being represented on the Climate Change and Air Management Coordination Board, in 2018 the European Commission criticised the lack of co-ordination between the climate change policy and energy policy of Turkey.  the chief climate change envoy is Mehmet Emin Birpınar, a Deputy Minister of Environment.

See also
Air pollution in Turkey
 İlbank

References

Public Works and Settlement
Turkey